Kyle Patten is a Welsh professional football midfielder who currently plays for Cymru Premier side Barry Town United.

Career
Patten is a product of the Newport County Academy. In August 2014 he was an unused substitute in the match versus Burton Albion and in September 2014 Patten signed his first professional contract with Newport County under manager Justin Edinburgh. In the same month Patten joined Bath City on a one-month loan. In January 2015 Patten joined Merthyr Town on loan. Patten made his football league debut for Newport County on 18 April 2015 as a second-half substitute in the League Two match versus Dagenham & Redbridge.

He was released by Newport in May 2015.

References

External links

Living people
1994 births
Welsh footballers
English Football League players
Association football midfielders
Newport County A.F.C. players
Bath City F.C. players
Merthyr Town F.C. players